Bridgeport is a city in eastern Harrison County, West Virginia, United States. The population was 9,325 at the 2020 census. It is part of the Clarksburg micropolitan area.

The town of Bridgeport had its beginning in pre-American Revolutionary War times. In 1764, John Simpson entered the area and gave his name to Simpson Creek. Bridgeport was chartered in 1816. When the town was incorporated in 1887, it established the office of mayor and town council. The city currently employs a City Manager. Bridgeport is home to Meadowbrook Mall, a 100-store regional shopping complex serving North-Central West Virginia.

History
Bridgeport originally got its name from a cartographer's mistake. Settled in the mid-1700s by early fur traders who came west over the Allegheny Mountains, settlers were forced to build forts to protect themselves from the elements, as well as from Native Americans who didn't care for the intrusion on their lands. Thus, as legend has it, what was known as Bridge Fort was mistakenly deemed Bridgeport.  

On June 29, 2006, the city became noted as the site of a showdown over the issue of separation of church and state in the United States.  A portrait of Jesus originally hung on a wall at Bridgeport High School.  Two parents filed suit in federal court to have the portrait removed, after the Harrison County Board of Education deadlocked over whether to remove the portrait.  The portrait of Jesus was stolen from Bridgeport High School early in the morning on August 17, 2006 and a mirror was put in its place. 

In 2016, two baseball teams from Bridgeport won Little League state championships.

Education

High schools
 Bridgeport High School

Primary and middle schools 
 Bridgeport Middle School
 Johnson Elementary School
 Simpson Elementary School
 Heritage Christian School

Libraries
 Bridgeport Public Library

Geography
Bridgeport is located at  (39.296544, -80.251305), along Simpson Creek.

Demographics

2010 census
At the 2010 census there were 8,149 people, 3,458 households, and 2,383 families living in the city. The racial makeup of the city was 95.5% White, 1.1% African American, 0.2% Native American, 1.9% Asian, 0.2% from other races, and 1.1% from two or more races. Hispanic or Latino of any race were 1.7%.

Of the 3,458 households 30.2% had children under the age of 18 living with them, 56.7% were married couples living together, 9.2% had a female householder with no husband present, 3.1% had a male householder with no wife present, and 31.1% were non-families. 28.2% of households were one person and 12.8% were one person aged 65 or older. The average household size was 2.34 and the average family size was 2.86.

The median age was 44.7 years. 21.9% of residents were under the age of 18; 5.1% were between the ages of 18 and 24; 23.5% were from 25 to 44; 30.8% were from 45 to 64; and 18.8% were 65 or older. The gender makeup of the city was 47.7% male and 52.3% female.

2000 census
At the 2000 census there were 7,306 people, 2,988 households, and 2,103 families living in the city. The population density was 880.4 people per square mile (339.9/km). There were 3,190 housing units at an average density of 384.4 per square mile (148.4/km).  The racial makeup of the city was 96.93% White, 1.25% African American, 0.05% Native American, 1.05% Asian, 0.19% from other races, and 0.52% from two or more races. Hispanic or Latino of any race were 1.29%.

Of the 2,988 households 30.5% had children under the age of 18 living with them, 60.8% were married couples living together, 7.9% had a female householder with no husband present, and 29.6% were non-families. 26.9% of households were one person and 13.5% were one person aged 65 or older. The average household size was 2.41 and the average family size was 2.94.

The age distribution was 23.0% under the age of 18, 5.7% from 18 to 24, 25.0% from 25 to 44, 26.7% from 45 to 64, and 19.6% 65 or older. The median age was 43 years. For every 100 females, there were 87.2 males. For every 100 females age 18 and over, there were 83.1 males.

The median household income was $49,310 and the median family income  was $58,825. Males had a median income of $46,590 versus $29,861 for females. The per capita income for the city was $25,132. About 3.7% of families and 5.0% of the population were below the poverty line, including 6.6% of those under age 18 and 3.6% of those age 65 or over.

Economy 
In September 2022, battery startup SPARKZ announced it would convert a former glass plant in Bridgeport into a production facility for zero-cobalt lithium batteries.

Transportation 
North Central West Virginia Airport is located in Bridgeport. Allegiant Air has scheduled service to Orlando–Sanford and Myrtle Beach. United Express offers flights to Chicago–O'Hare and Washington–Dulles.

Bridgeport landmarks 
 Pete Dye Golf Club opened in 1993, rated the number one golf course in West Virginia and number 60 on America's 100 Greatest Golf Courses by Golf Digest.
 Simpson Creek Baptist Church is recognized as the oldest Baptist church in West Virginia by the West Virginia Baptist Convention and is also generally accepted as being the oldest Protestant church west of the Allegheny Mountains. The first formal records of the church are dated 1774.
 Simpson Creek Covered Bridge located off of Meadowbrook Road.  Built in 1881 by Asa Hugill.  One of only two covered bridges that still stand today in Harrison County.
 The Bridgeport Lamp Chimney Company Bowstring Concrete Arch Bridge
 The Governor Joseph Johnson House, also known as Oakdale

Notable people

 Michael Late Benedum, founder of Benedum-Trees Oil Company
 Mike Florio, sports writer
 Joseph Johnson, only Governor of Virginia (1852–56) from west of the Alleghenies
 Senator Waldo Porter Johnson of Missouri
 T. Michael Martin, young adult novelist, author of 'The End Games'
 Colonel Benjamin Wilson

References

External links

 City of Bridgeport official website
 Greater Bridgeport Conference and Visitors Center

 
Cities in West Virginia
Cities in Harrison County, West Virginia
Northwestern Turnpike
Clarksburg micropolitan area
1816 establishments in Virginia